The thinspine sea catfish (Plicofollis layardi), also known as the Day's catfish, is a species of catfish in the family Ariidae. It was described by Francis Day in 1866, originally under the genus Arius. It inhabits brackish and coastal marine waters in Mozambique, Sri Lanka, and the Persian Gulf.

The diet of the thinspine sea catfish includes bony fish and benthic invertebrates. It is of minor value to commercial fisheries.

References

Ariidae
Fish described in 1866